The term game of the week refers to a weekly, national television broadcast of a featured sporting event in a league, usually involving major, popular, or leading teams. 

Specific broadcasts using the term include:
Major League Baseball Game of the Week
NFL Films Game of the Week
NHL Game of the Week
America's Game of the Week